The Sunraycer was a solar-powered race car designed to compete in the World Solar Challenge, the world's first race featuring solar-powered cars. The Sunraycer was a joint collaboration between General Motors, AeroVironment, and Hughes Aircraft.

The Sunraycer won the first World Solar Challenge in 1987. The team's lead driver was John Harvey, an Australian driver with (at the time) nearly 40 years of racing experience. Harvey was involved with the testing and development of the Sunraycer at the General Motors Proving Ground in Arizona.

Development 
The Sunraycer project started with a request from GM's Australian division to GM Headquarters to participate in the upcoming World Solar Challenge. This race, to be held in Australia in late 1987, would feature purely solar-powered cars. Roger Smith, the CEO of GM, was interested in the idea and agreed to fund a study to see if a solar powered car could be built within 10 months. Smith hired AeroVironment to do the study. A month later, AeroVironment engineers concluded that a highly competitive car could be built within the time available. AeroVironment, led by Paul MacCready, was given the contract to build what would be called the Sunraycer.

During the conceptual process, the goal was to create a very low-weight and ultra-low wind resistance vehicle. With this in mind, AeroVironment produced a design that proved to be very lightweight (only ) and created a very low drag coefficient (cd: 0.125).

A total of 8800 solar cells were manufactured and installed by a team from Hughes Aircraft. At high noon, the car would generate about 1500 watts of power.

The engine was created for the Sunraycer by GM using a brand new electric motor based on Magnequench permanent magnets. This kind of rare-earth magnet was invented in 1983 independently by the GM physics department and Sumitomo Special Metals. Both companies discovered and eventually commercialized two significantly different manufacturing processes for this material class; the GM concept was commercialized under the Magnequench brand. The new motor was lightweight and efficient; GM stated its motor efficiency was around 92%. In 2011 its constructor won the IEEE Nikola Tesla Award.

Aside from the driver, the single heaviest element in the car was the Hughes battery pack that utilized silver-oxide batteries. These batteries were included to provide extra power when passing trucks, to smooth out the performance of the vehicle, and because the race rules mandated driving only between the hours of 8 AM to 5 PM, but the cars were allowed to charge their batteries from sunlight even when they were not on the road, allowing driving during allowed hours even when the weather was overcast.

The frame of the car weighed 14 pounds. AeroVironment engineers made use of Kevlar for the shell of the car. The Sunraycer was tested through the spring and summer of 1987.

The Sunraycer reportedly cost slightly less than $2 million to build.

Race 
The race, in November 1987, was from Darwin in the north of Australia, to Adelaide in the south. The race course followed the Stuart Highway for nearly the entire trip, going past Alice Springs in the middle of the continent.

The Sunraycer, driven by John Harvey, won the pole position with the fastest speed of all the 24 contestants (109 km/h), remaining in first place for the entire race. This was 50% faster than the second place vehicle (which arrived in Adelaide two days after the Sunraycer). Roger Smith, the GM CEO, went to Adelaide to congratulate his winning team.

By comparison, the winning car in the 2005 World Solar Challenge was the Nuna 3, which had a top speed of 140 km/h (87 mph) and cruised with speeds of 110 to 120 km/h (av. speed 103 km/h for entire 3000 km). This record held until it was broken by UNSW Sunswift in January 2011.

Post-race and legacy 
GM put the Sunraycer on tour, where it was displayed at several events across the United States. GM also produced a promotional 30-minute film about the Sunraycer aimed at middle-school and high-school students, narrated by one of the drivers of the Sunraycer. GM then donated the Sunraycer to the Smithsonian Institution.

The Sunraycer led directly to the creation of the GM Impact, an electric powered car also designed by AeroVironment with help from both GM and Hughes; though the Sunraycer used solar power and not electrical power, it was not considered feasible at the time to create a solar-powered car for the American car market. The GM Impact led to the GM EV-1, an experimental electric car which was leased to customers for a few years in the late 1990s before being controversially retired and scrapped.

See also 
 The Quiet Achiever

References

External links 
 Paul MacCready talks about the Sunraycer project
 Smithsonian article on the Sunraycer
 EV-1 Timeline
 Paul MacCready bio
 Short history of the Solar powered car race
 

Racing cars
Solar car racing